Ya mong ("balm") is an ordinary medicine that people have in their houses which contains with herbs and many other medicine. It has about liquid state with white or yellow color and other colors because of its ingredients. It has scented smell and people use it for healing dizziness, fainting, car sickness, boat sickness, massaging muscles, wound from insect bite, and others.

History

Ya mong was first mentioned in the article of document that was published on the 25th anniversary of Haw Par Brothers International Limited (Legend from a jar : the story of Haw Par : Haw Par Brothers International Limited's 25th anniversary commemorative book, 1994) who is the owner and the manufacturer of ya mong and the first product that uses the word ya mong globally. The article details the events in the year 1800 which there was a doctor of herb medicine from China named Aw Chu Kin who travelled to Burma which in that period Burma was colonized by England. He set up his little herbal shop until he had 3 sons including Boon Leong, Boon Haw and Boon Par but his eldest, Boon Leong died early when he was only a kid. Boon Haw and Boon Pa were educated in a British school in Burma. Boon Haw misbehaved so he was sent back to China. Boon Pa was the only child who was taught by his father about making herbal medicine from official royal palace of China until his father died. He continued his father's business. Boon Pa studied western prescription and he created his own way until he succeed making and selling his product which became famous in that period. He called his brother to help his business from China, Boon Haw. Until the World War 1 period, they moved out from Burma to Singapore and continued their business and became successful worldwide and got the name ya mong in Thailand. The word mong reflects the product that has originated from Burma.

Timeline

1871 – Tiger balm (ya mong) originated in Burma

1908 – Tiger balm moved to Singapore and sold in Thailand

1932 – Balm word used instead of beeswax

1940 – The word balm means scented object for healing pain from dictionary of Thai-British from Sor or- Sethabut

1982 – Dictionary of royal institute defined the word ya mong as a beeswax medicine

Ingredients

1. Cinnamomum Camphora - relieves conjunctivitis, drives away phlegm and breath

2. Mental - Adds sweet smell

3. Borneol – for smelling, relieves dizziness; for fainting, relieves pain and ache

4. Paraffin – mixture for solid state

5. Vaseline – mixture to make it have slippery texture

6. Herbs: Gaultheria oil – relieves sprain and pain, Cinnamon oil – prevents colic pain, Cloves – relieves stomachache, Eucalyptus oil – prevents bug bites, Methyl salicylate – loosens muscle

Properties

-for smelling to heal from dizziness, fainting.

-for fainting and massaging muscle, healing pains and aches, bruises and insect bites

References
 The tigerbalm philosophy. (n.d.). Retrieved from TIGER BALM: http://www.tigerbalm.com/en/pages/about

จักรกริช อังศุธร, เ. ต. (2542). การศึกษาความเป็นไปได้ในการนำเสนอผลิตภัณฑ์ยาหม่องขี้ผึ้งในรูปแบบใหม่สู่ตลาดเมืองไทย. จักริช และคณะ.

ยาหม่อง (Balm) ส่วนผสมและสรรพคุณยาหม่อง. (n.d.). Retrieved from siamchemi: http://www.siamchemi.com/%E0%B8%A2%E0%B8%B2%E0%B8%AB%E0%B8%A1%E0%B9%88%E0%B8%AD%E0%B8%87/

(1994). In Paik-Choo, Legend from a jar : the story of Haw Par : Haw Par Brothers International Limited's 25th anniversary commemorative book. Singapore: Haw Par Brothers International. 

Ointments
Thai culture